South Fork is an unincorporated community within the Rural Municipality of Arlington No. 79, Saskatchewan, Canada.

History

South Fork began in 1913. By 1923 there were three grain elevators, a lumber yard, cafe, blacksmith, pool hall, feed mill, and general store.

A fire in 1928, the depression, and better roads started South Fork on a decline. South Fork is best known for its sole resident, a bearded man by the name of Nicholas Herlinger.

The last grain elevator closed in 1974 and moved to an area farm.

See also 

 List of communities in Saskatchewan
 Hamlets of Saskatchewan
 List of ghost towns in Canada
 Ghost towns in Saskatchewan

References

Arlington No. 79, Saskatchewan
Former villages in Saskatchewan
Unincorporated communities in Saskatchewan
Populated places established in 1913
Ghost towns in Saskatchewan
Division No. 4, Saskatchewan